Pimenta pseudocaryophyllus, popularly known as cataia, craveiro or louro-cravo, is a species from the family Myrtaceae.

It is largely distributed in pantropical and subtropical regions, including Central America and South America.<ref>{{cite journal|last1=Paula|first1=Joelma Abadia Marciano de|last2=Silva|first2=Maria do Rosário Rodrigues|last3=Costa|first3=Maysa P.|last4=Diniz|first4=Danielle Guimarães Almeida|last5=Sá|first5=Fabyola A. S.|last6=Alves|first6=Suzana Ferreira|last7=Costa|first7=Élson Alves|last8=Lino|first8=Roberta Campos|last9=Paula|first9=José Realino de|title=Phytochemical Analysis and Antimicrobial, Antinociceptive, and Anti-Inflammatory Activities of Two Chemotypes of Pimenta pseudocaryophyllus(Myrtaceae)|journal=Evidence-Based Complementary and Alternative Medicine|date=2012|volume=2012|page=420715|doi=10.1155/2012/420715|pmid=23082081|pmc=3469278}} ( Paula et al., 2012)</ref>

Chemical composition
It contains chavibetol and methyleugenol.

Uses
Traditional medicine
It is a medicinal plant in traditional folk medicine. The leaves are used to prepare a refreshing drink known for its putative diuretic, sedative, and aphrodisiac actions.

The population of Guaraqueçaba, in the state of Paraná, Brazil, uses an infusion of P. pseudocaryophyllus leaves in the form of tea to treat the predisposition to arthritical and gouty affections of the joints, fever and other diseases.
Studies about P. pseudocaryophyllus'' describe its extracts as having anxiolytic and sedative action and antioxidant activity.

References

pseudocaryophyllus
Flora of Central America
Flora of South America
Flora of Brazil
Flora of the Atlantic Forest
Medicinal plants
Medicinal plants of South America
Pantropical flora